California's 12th district may refer to:

 California's 12th congressional district
 California's 12th State Assembly district
 California's 12th State Senate district